is a station on the Tokyo Monorail in Ōta, Tokyo, Japan.

Lines
Only all-stations "Local" services stop at this station.

Adjacent stations

History
The station opened on 27 September 1993.

Passenger statistics
In fiscal 2011, the station was used by an average of 3,156 passengers daily.

Surrounding area
The station serves the maintenance facilities of Haneda Airport and is mainly used by airline and support industry workers. It is located adjacent to the JAL Maintenance Center, which houses the JAL Sky Museum, and is within walking distance of the ANA Maintenance Center which is also used for public tours.

See also
 List of railway stations in Japan

References

External links

  

Tokyo Monorail Haneda Line
Stations of Tokyo Monorail
Railway stations in Tokyo
Railway stations in Japan opened in 1993
Haneda Airport